South Hampstead is a ward in the London Borough of Camden, in the United Kingdom. The ward covers the area of the same name and was first used for the 2022 Camden London Borough Council election, electing three councillors to Camden Council. Most of its area was previously in Swiss Cottage ward, which was abolished at the same time, although sections of Kilburn and West Hampstead wards have also been incorporated under the new boundaries. In 2018, the ward had an electorate of 8,904. The Boundary Commission projects the electorate to rise to 8,927 by 2025.

South Hampstead ward covers the part of the area known as "the gardens", bordered by West End Lane, Belsize Road, Finchley Road and Broadhurst Gardens. It is served by South Hampstead station on the London Overground, in addition to several bus routes running through the area.

The ward currently returns three councillors to Camden Council, with an election every four years. At the last election in May 2022, all three candidates from the Labour Party were elected to represent the ward.

Councillors 
Three councillors currently represent South Hampstead ward.

Election results

Elections in the 2020s

References

Wards of the London Borough of Camden
2022 establishments in England